Kim Gaboury better known by his pseudonym Akido (stylized as aKido) is a Canadian electronic rock musician and composer based in Montreal, Quebec. Gaboury assembles a band for live performances, but records without them in the studio.

Career
As a young man Gaboury played guitar for the band Zolof.

In 2004, calling himself Akido, he released a seven-track instrumental album; he also released a song, "Les Humains", which was later the basis for of an animated music video created by Felix Lajeunesse and Paul Raphaël. Another 2004 release, "Playtime", was played regularly on campus and community radio stations that year.

In September 2007, according to The R3-30, the aKido song "Dancing in Chains" was the third-most popular indie song in Canada.

Gaboury joined Michel Cusson, Térez Montcalm and Luck Mervil to form the Cafe Elektric collective; the group performed at the 2009 Francofolies festival.

AKido's album "Gamechanger", released on the Nordique label in August 2010, was number 13 on the !earshot Top 20 Electronic chart for 2010. In January 2011, Gamechanger was nominated for the Electronica Album category for The 10th Annual Independent Music Awards, and in October 2011, nominated for the "Album électronique de l'année" at l'ADISQ.

In 2012 Akido's recording "Undark" received regular airplay on campus and community radio in the Montreal area.

In March 2014, Kim was nominated at the 2nd Canadian Screen Awards in the Canadian Screen Award for Best Original Score category for the film Maïna.

AKido collaborated with electronic music producer Pascal Asselin, known as Millimetrik, to create the 2016 album Fog Dreams.

Discography 
 Playtime, 2004
 Blink, 2007
 GameChanger, 2010
 Undark, 2012

Reissues 
 Blink Reissue, 2010
 Playtime Reissue, 2010

EP 
Les Humains, 2010
Thearly Ears, 2010

Videoclips 
"Dancing in Chains"
"Les Humains"

References

External links 

 

Living people
Canadian electronic musicians
Musicians from Montreal
Musicians from Quebec City
Canadian classical composers
Canadian male classical composers
Canadian film score composers
Male film score composers
Year of birth missing (living people)